The Constitution of the Republic of South Ossetia was adopted by referendum on April 8, 2001. The previous constitution was adopted on November 2, 1993.

Structure
The constitution consists of 93 articles arranged into nine chapters and has concluding and transitional provisions besides.

Fundamentals of the Constitutional System of the Republic of South Ossetia
Rights, Liberties, and Civil Duties of Man and Citizen 
President of the Republic of South Ossetia
Parliament of the Republic of South Ossetia
Government of the Republic of South Ossetia
Judiciary of the Republic of South Ossetia
Office of the Prosecutor of the Republic of South Ossetia
Local State Administration and Self-Government 
Constitutional Amendments and Revision of the Constitution of the Republic of South Ossetia
Concluding and Transitional Provisions

References

External links
Text of the 2001 constitution

South Ossetia
South Ossetia
Politics of South Ossetia
1993 in law
1993 documents
2001 documents